Parkville railway station is a railway station currently under construction as part of the Metro Tunnel project. It will be built below Grattan Street between Leicester and Elizabeth Streets. The station will be built using the cut-and-cover method. Construction commenced in 2018. It is due to open in 2025, serving the large health and education precinct in the area. It is set to be an interchange between the Metro Tunnel and the proposed Metro Tunnel 2, and provisions have been left in the design of the station to allow for this. This new station will provide a direct connection to the metropolitan train network for Parkville for the first time.

Design
The station's materials will feature sandstone, steel, glass and bluestone.

Parkville Precinct
Parkville will become a “grand promenade” to connect the area’s health, research and education buildings. A new tram 'super stop' will be constructed on Royal Parade, as well as realigned traffic lanes, bicycle lanes, bus stops, footpaths and pedestrian crossings. There will also be more than 250 bicycle parking spaces created.

Services from 2025  
Platform 1:
  All stations and limited express services to Sunbury

Platform 2:
  Express services to Pakenham and Cranbourne

References

External links

Proposed railway stations in Melbourne
Railway stations scheduled to open in 2025
Railway stations located underground in Melbourne
Railway stations in the City of Melbourne (LGA)